Koose Munisamy Veerappan (18 January 1952 – 18 October 2004) was an Indian bandit turned domestic terrorist who was active for 36 years, and kidnapped major politicians for ransom. He was charged with sandalwood smuggling and poaching of elephants in the scrub lands and forests in the states of Tamil Nadu, Karnataka and Kerala.

He was wanted for killing approximately 184 people, about half of whom were police officers and forest officials and was also wanted for poaching more than 2000 elephants and smuggling ivory worth US$2.6 million (₹16 crore) and about 65 tons of sandalwood worth approximately US$22 million (₹143 crore).

The battle to capture Veerappan cost the governments of Tamil Nadu and Karnataka over ₹100 crore.

Personal life
Veerappan was born into a Tamil Vanniyar family in Gopinatham, Kollegal, Coimbatore District (Madras State) in 1952. In 1990, he was married to Muthulakshmi, who reportedly married him because of his "notoriety and moustache". As of 2004, his two daughters, Vidya Rani (born in 1990) and Prabha (born in 1993), were studying in Tamil Nadu. Vidya Rani, married a Christian Dalit man much against her mother's opposition to inter-caste marriage.
He enjoyed support from Pattali Makkal Katchi party which openly sought for clemency on behalf of Veerappan.

Criminal history
Veerappan began his criminal career by assisting his uncle Saalvai Gounder, a notorious poacher and sandalwood smuggler. Veerappan initially worked as a sandalwood and ivory smuggler, killing elephants for their tusks. He later broke away from his uncle. Over the next twenty-five years, Veerappan (and other poachers together) killed 2,000 to 3,000 elephants]. He was first arrested in 1972.

After committing his first murder, at the age of 17, he began killing those who resisted his illegal activities. His victims tended to be police officers, forest officials, and informants.

In 1987, Veerappan kidnapped and murdered a Sathyamangalam Taluka forest officer named Chidambaram from Tamil Nadu. This brought his activities to the attention of the Indian Government.
He drew further attention by murdering a senior IFS officer, Pandillapalli Srinivas in November 1991. Next, there was the August 1992 ambush of a police party, which included a senior IPS officer, Harikrishna.

Veerappan was not averse to killing civilians, and killed a man from his native village for traveling in a police jeep. He regularly killed anyone suspected of being a police informer. Because of political instability, Veerappan could easily escape from one state to another. State jurisdiction problems also prevented police officers from entering other states to apprehend Veerappan.

Palar blast 

In Govindapadi, Mettur, Veerappan killed a Bandari person whom he suspected of being a police informer. As a result, a 41-member team of police officers and forestry officials were called in to investigate. On 9 April 1993, landmines were detonated underneath the two vehicles in which the team was traveling. The blast occurred at Palar, near Malai Mahadeswara Hills (present-day Chamarajanagar District, Karnataka) and killed 22 members of the team. Known as the Palar blast, this was Veerappan's single largest mass killing.

Special Task Force 

In 1992, the Karnataka and the Tamil Nadu Governments formed a Special Task Force to catch Veerappan. It was headed in Tamil Nadu by Sanjay Arora and in Karnataka by Shankar Bidri with Walter Devaram as the joint chief. In February 1992, his lieutenant Gurunathan was killed by the Karnataka task force, with SI Shakeel Ahmed single-handedly responsible for the capture. Three months later, Veerappan attacked the Ramapura police station in Kollegal, killing several policemen and capturing arms and ammunition. In August 1992, Veerappan laid a trap for SI Shakeel Ahmed, killing him along with five others. The Karnataka and Tamil Nadu Special Task Forces then began intensified combing operations along the two states' border areas and also around Gopinatham village, Veerappan's birthplace.

Through these operations, under charge of Sanjay Arora and Shankar Bidari, the gang was reduced to 5 members.
Meetings with Gopinatham villagers were held, and the 5-crore bounty was announced. In 1993, the task force arrested Veerappan's wife, Muthulakshmi, and charged her with aiding, but she was acquitted of all charges.

Kidnapping of Rajkumar 

On 30 July 2000, Veerappan abducted Kannada cinema actor Rajkumar and three others from Dodda Gajanur, a village in Sathyamangalam taluk Erode district near the Tamil Nadu-Karnataka border, where the film star was attending his housewarming ceremony.
Public outcry and violence ensued in Bangalore as well as other parts of Karnataka. A bandh, or strike, also occurred on 22 September in Bangalore. Karnataka's Chief Minister and police personnel sought the help of Tamil Nadu Government and visited Chennai seeking help. Negotiations were conducted and R. Gopal, an editor of the Tamil magazine Nakkeeran, was involved in several rounds of talks with Veerappan. Gopal had earlier visited Veerappan for similar negotiations,
and visited the forest several times for videotaped discussions. Veerappan demanded justice for Tamil Nadu in the Cauvery Water dispute, as well as making Tamil the second official language of Karnataka and the release of certain Tamil political prisoners jailed in Tamil Nadu. Rajkumar was held for 108 days and finally released without harm in November 2000. A police official later suggested that 20 crore rupees had been paid by Karnataka government for his release.

Kidnapping of Nagappa 

On 25 August 2002, Veerappan abducted H. Nagappa, a former minister of Karnataka, from his village in Kamagere, Chamarajanagar district.
Nagappa had been a minister for Agricultural Marketing from 1996 to 1999. The Joint Special task forces of Karnataka and Tamil Nadu worked with the Kerala police to help release Nagappa.
encounter to release him failed, and Nagappa was found dead three months later in a Karnataka forest. The reward offered by the Karnataka state government was then increased to 15 crore rupees.

Ransom demands 

For several years during the 1990s, Veerappan kidnapped police officials and other personalities and demanded ransom money. It is believed that ransoms were often unofficially paid. In July 1997, he kidnapped nine forest officials in the Burude forests in Chamarajanagar district. In that case, the hostages were released unharmed a few years later even though his ransom demand was not met. It is also believed that Veerappan buried large amounts of money in various parts of the forest; in 2002 police recovered 3.3 million rupees from his gang members.

Banned organisations like the Tamil National Retrieval Troops (TNRT) and Tamil Nadu Liberation Army helped Veerappan to secure a Robin Hood image and to draft terms of negotiations when he kidnapped prominent people. Kolathur Mani, president of Dravidar Viduthalai Kazhagam, formerly the Periyar Dravidar Kazhagam (PDK) party, was arrested and brought to trial as an accomplice in several of Veerappan's crimes, although later acquitted due to lack of evidence.

Death 
On 18 October 2004, Veerappan and three of his associates were killed by the Tamil Nadu Special Task Force and N. K. Senthamarai Kannan under the proactive leadership of K Vijayakumar. 
The encounter happened near the village of Papparapatti
in Dharmapuri district, Tamil Nadu. Veerappan and his men were lured into an ambulance by an undercover policeman under the pretext of taking them to Dharmapuri for medical treatment. The Tamil Nadu Special Task Force, which had been observing his movements for several months, surrounded the ambulance, and the gangsters were killed in the ensuing gunfight.

The entire operation was named Operation Cocoon. Veerappan's associates Sethukuli Govindan, Chandre Gowdar and Sethumani were also killed in the operation.

His death was described as the "death of a demon". The villagers of Gopinatham celebrated with firecrackers on hearing the news.

Several human rights activists, who rallied under the banner of the Centre for Protection of Civil Liberties (CPCL), claimed that circumstantial evidence indicated that Veerappan was murdered by police after being tortured.
Since Veerappan's death, Gopinatham has been promoted as a destination for ecotourism by the Karnataka State Department of Forest and Tourism.

Veerappan was buried at Moolakkadu near Mettur in Tamil Nadu, as his family members were more attached to it and most of his relatives in Gopinatham had left. The police had planned a cremation but decided on a burial after objections from Veerappan's relatives. Thousands of people turned out for the burial, while others were kept away by heavy security.

Timeline

Legacy
On April 25, 2013, the Pattali Makkal Katchi and the Vanniyar Sangam projected Veerappan as a youth icon at the Vanniyar Youth Cultural Festival at Mamallapuram. The incident was condemned by Jayalalithaa, the then Chief Minister of Tamil Nadu.

In media

Film and television 
Veerappan – a 1991 Indian Kannada-language crime action film by Raveendranath, starring Devaraj in the titular role of the bandit.
Attahasa – a 2012 Kannada film, is based on Veerappan's life and death. The movie highlights the STF operations on Veerappan, kidnapping of Dr. Rajkumar and ultimately the Operation Cocoon. The film was also dubbed to Telugu and Malayalam in 2013 titled as Veerappan and in Tamil as Vana Yuddham.
Killing Veerappan – a 2016 Kannada film, written and directed by Ram Gopal Varma based on Operation Cocoon. The film was also released in Tamil, Telugu and Malayalam consequently with the same title.
 Veerappan – a 2016 Hindi full length biographical feature film written and directed by Ram Gopal Varma. The film was also released in Tamil as Villathi Villan Veerappan.
Sandhanakaadu – a 2007 Tamil television series aired on Makkal TV, based on Veerappan's life starring Karate Raja as Veerappan.

Books

See also 
 Lampiao
 Paan Singh Tomar
 Phoolan Devi
 Seema Parihar
 Sucha Singh Soorma
 Velupillai Prabhakaran

References

External links
 The Veerappan Saga Rediff.com. 14 July 1997 – 20 October 2004.

1952 births
2004 deaths
Indian murderers
Indian kidnappers
Indian robbers
Indian smugglers
Indian hunters
Poachers
Crime in Karnataka
Crime in Tamil Nadu
Criminals from Tamil Nadu
Indian gangsters killed in encounters
Murdered Indian gangsters
Illegal logging in India